The 1978 Federation Cup was the 16th edition of the most important competition between national teams in women's tennis.  The tournament was held at the Kooyong Lawn Tennis Club in Melbourne, Australia, from 27 November – 3 December. The United States won their third consecutive title, defeating Australia in their eighth final.

Qualifying round

Ireland vs. Finland

South Korea vs. Chinese Taipei

Philippines vs. Thailand

Main draw

All ties were played at the Kooyong Lawn Tennis Club in Melbourne, Australia, on grass courts.

First round

United States vs. South Korea

Canada vs. New Zealand

Argentina vs. Denmark

Sweden vs. France

Czechoslovakia vs. Portugal

Philippines vs. Indonesia

West Germany vs. Brazil

Spain vs. Great Britain

Soviet Union vs. Austria

Yugoslavia vs. Norway

Romania vs. Italy

Ireland vs. Switzerland

Netherlands vs. Mexico

Chile vs. Uruguay

Israel vs. Japan

Belgium vs. Australia

Second round

United States vs. New Zealand

Argentina vs. France

Czechoslovakia vs. Indonesia

West Germany vs. Great Britain

Soviet Union vs. Yugoslavia

Romania vs. Switzerland

Netherlands vs. Chile

Japan vs. Australia

Quarterfinals

United States vs. France

Czechoslovakia vs. Great Britain

Soviet Union vs. Romania

Netherlands vs. Australia

Semifinals

United States vs. Great Britain

Soviet Union vs. Australia

Final

United States vs. Australia

References

Billie Jean King Cups by year
Federation
Tennis tournaments in Australia
Sports competitions in Melbourne
Fed
Federation Cup
Federation Cup, 1978
Federation Cup
Federation Cup